The Literary Contest of Novels for Youth (Maltese: Konkors ta' Kitba Letteratura għaż-Żgħażagħ) is an annual contest organised by the National Youth Agency (Maltese: Aġenzija żgħażagħ) and the National Book Council (Maltese: Kunsill Nazzjonali tal-Ktieb). The 2020 edition of the Literary contest was won by the author Lon Kirkop with his manuscript Mitt Elf Isem Ieħor: HappyVeganGirlJules.

The contest is judged anonymously by three adjudicators appointed by the National Book Council.

Winners

References

Maltese literary awards
Maltese children's literature